David Alan Hughes (born 25 April 1960) is an English keyboardist who played in different new wave bands, and later became successful making music for films.

Biography

New wave years
A self-taught musician, David Hughes was born in Birkenhead, England.  He founded Dalek I Love You in 1977, alongside guitarist Alan Gill, bassist David Balfe and Chris Teepee. He, alongside Gill, was a remaining member, playing on the first three singles and the debut album, Compass Kumpas, in 1980. However, in January 1980, he left the band, and the album was released in May, when he had left.

In January 1980 he joined Orchestral Manoeuvres In The Dark as percussionist, although he switched to keyboards, and became the group's fourth member playing live on OMD's first headlining tour, live on the Old Grey Whistle Test  and for mimed performances of hit single Messages on Top of the Pops. There were some recordings of him with the band, among them the second Peel Sessions which the group did and the backing tracks for the song "Souvenir", created by himself. Hughes left OMD in November 1980 and "Souvenir" was released as a single in August 1981 and on the Architecture and Morality album in November 1981. He was subsequently replaced by Martin Cooper.

After leaving OMD, he teamed up with Keith Hartley, forming with him the synthpop duo Godot. The duo released a like-Dalek I's Compass Cumpas EP, Extended Player, in 1981. However, in that year, Alan Gill solicited the help of Hartley, in a reformed line-up of Dalek I Love You, and the latter joined. So, Hughes called for new members, being joined by Freeze Frame members Ronnie Stone on guitar and Steve Byrne on vocals, Martin Cooper, who replaced him in OMD, on saxophone, after playing it in the Extended Player EP, and a drummer. The band toured with Dalek I Love You, but shortly afterwards, Stone left to join China Crisis, and Godot split up. In August 1982, "Something's Missing", their last single, was released.

Later, he joined Freeze Frame for gigs. In 1983, he reformed synthpop band Games, although they only played one gig. He also played with Lotus Eaters, and collaborated with Thomas Lang.

Hughes currently composes for film and television, such as the Discworld films which he worked on with Paul E. Francis, as well as work in producing films. His first was Awaydays and more recently Powder, which was set in Liverpool.

Discography
With Dalek I Love You:
"Freedom Fighters" single (1979)
"Dalek I Love You (Destiny)" single (1980)
Compass kum'pəs (1980)

With Orchestral Manoeuvres in the Dark
Peel Sessions 1979-1983 (tracks 5-8):
 Pretending To See The Future
 Enola Gay
 Dancing
 Motion And Heart

References

External links
Robinparmar.com
Omd.uk.com

English keyboardists
English new wave musicians
People from Birkenhead
1960 births
Living people